Borgomaro (locally ) is a comune (municipality) in the Province of Imperia in the Italian region Liguria, located about  southwest of Genoa and about  northwest of Imperia.

Borgomaro borders the following municipalities: Aurigo, Caravonica, Carpasio, Chiusanico, Lucinasco, Pieve di Teco, Prelà, Rezzo, and Vasia.

References
 

Cities and towns in Liguria